Pennsylvania Railroad, Connecting Railway Bridge is a stone arch bridge in Philadelphia, Pennsylvania, that carries Amtrak Northeast Corridor rail lines and SEPTA and NJT commuter rail lines over the Schuylkill River. It is located in Fairmount Park, just upstream from the Girard Avenue Bridge.

It is also known as Pennsylvania Railroad, New York Division, Bridge No. 69. Other names include Connecting Railway Bridge, Connection Bridge, New York Connecting Bridge, New York Railroad Bridge, and Junction Railroad Bridge.

Initial bridge
The bridge was built in 1866 and 1867 by the Connecting Railway, a company affiliated with the Pennsylvania Railroad and formally purchased by the PRR in 1871. Its purpose was to connect the PRR's southern and northern lines, and to be part of an eventual direct PRR line from Washington, D.C., to New York City. Before the bridge's construction, PRR trains took a circuitous route between PRR's West Philadelphia and North Philadelphia Stations.

The bridge was probably designed by John A. Wilson, chief engineer of the Connecting Railway Company, who surveyed the route in 1863. Following Wilson's 1864 resignation, PRR First Vice-President George Brooke Roberts, an engineer, took over the project and saw it through to completion. (He later became president of the PRR.) Thomas Seabrook was the masonry contractor.

The bridge opened to traffic on 2 June 1867. The bridge was narrow, with only 2 tracks and an iron truss at mid-river. This was a  cast- and wrought-iron, arch-reinforced, double-intersection Whipple truss.

In 1873, PRR slightly reduced the truss's span by widening the stone piers at each end. Probably at the same time, PRR removed the truss's reinforcing arch. In 1897, PRR replaced the Whipple truss with a Pratt truss of the same length.

Expanded bridge
Between 1912 and 1915, PRR more than doubled the width of the bridge to 5 tracks, and replaced the mid-river iron truss with two massive stone arches. Alexander C. Shand was the designer of what was essentially a new bridge, built to look like the original. Eyre, Shoemaker, Inc. was the masonry contractor. Reiter, Curtis & Hill built the reinforced concrete bridges over Lansdowne Drive and West Girard Avenue, and the viaduct curving around the Philadelphia Zoo.

In art
The Connecting Railway Bridge, with its line of stone arches, was a frequent subject for painters. It appears in works by Carl Philipp Weber, Edmund Darch Lewis, Thomas Moran, and, most famously, Max Schmitt in a Single Scull (1871) by Thomas Eakins.

Other images

See also
List of bridges documented by the Historic American Engineering Record in Pennsylvania
List of crossings of the Schuylkill River
List of Northeast Corridor infrastructure

References

Further reading

External links

 by Jack Boucher, 1995.

Bridges in Philadelphia
Bridges completed in 1867
Bridges completed in 1915
Railroad bridges in Pennsylvania
Pennsylvania Railroad bridges
Bridges over the Schuylkill River
Historic American Engineering Record in Philadelphia
Historic American Buildings Survey in Philadelphia
1867 establishments in Pennsylvania
Viaducts in the United States
Stone arch bridges in the United States
Pratt truss bridges in the United States
NJ Transit bridges
SEPTA
Amtrak bridges
Northeast Corridor